Montana Park is a residential suburb of Pretoria in Gauteng, South Africa. It is situated to the north east of the Pretoria CBD.

Over the recent years, Montana has experienced a considerable influx of Africans. As of 2019 November, the official language in the area can be said to be English, followed by both Setswana and Afrikaans. The racial mix is neutralising fairly well.

The average family heads in the suburb are predominantly middle age and upper working class. Many houses are three bedrooms with fairly average stand sizes suitable for city living. The main road in the area is Sefako Makgatho Drive (R513).

Majority of the people in the area are government professionals.

References

Suburbs of Pretoria